was a Japanese sprinter. He competed in the men's 4 × 100 metres relay at the 1928 Summer Olympics.

References

1905 births
Year of death missing
Place of birth missing
Japanese male sprinters
Olympic male sprinters
Olympic athletes of Japan
Athletes (track and field) at the 1928 Summer Olympics
Japan Championships in Athletics winners